Velo de novia (English: The Bride's Veil) is a Mexican telenovela produced by Juan Osorio for Televisa in 2003. It aired on Canal de las Estrellas from June 30, 2003 to January 2, 2004. The telenovela stars Susana González, Eduardo Santamarina, Héctor Suárez, Cynthia Klitbo, Blanca Guerra and Carmen Salinas.

The 1st part is based on 1969 Brazilian telenovela Véu de Noiva and its an adaptation of the 1971 mexican telenovela of the same name . The 2nd part is based on 1989 Venezuelan telenovela Rubí rebelde and 1991 Mexican telenovela Yo no creo en los hombres.

Plot
Andrea (Susana González) is a young and beautiful woman, with a strong will to live even though her life expectancy is short; she suffers from a potentially fatal heart condition.

She works as a seamstress at a clothing factory. One day she is assigned to make a bridal veil for Raquela Villaseñor del Moral (Cynthia Klitbo), the factory owner’s daughter, who is engaged to José Manuel del Álamo Sánchez (Eduardo Santamarina), a famous cyclist.

Fate will make this veil, created with much love and dedication, to eventually belong to Andrea. José Manuel realizes too late that whom he truly loves is Ángeles (Marlene Favela), Raquela’s sister. Ángeles loves him too, but she is very aware that their love is impossible.

Ángeles suffers a fatal accident at the same time that Andrea has a heart attack. Ángeles is an organ donor, and Andrea's life is saved when she becomes the recipient of Ángeles' heart. After losing his true love, José Manuel’s personality changes drastically; he is no longer the happy and cheerful young man that he used to be.

Yet he gets another chance at love when he meets Andrea, who has always admired him as an internationally renowned champion athlete.  Soon they fall in love. He does not know that she received Ángeles' heart.

Raquela comes to suspect and fear that the ghost of her sister still lives on in Andrea’s new heart and that it has returned to steal José Manuel from her again. Meanwhile, Azael Villaseñor (Héctor Suárez), Raquela's father, is pressuring José Manuel to fulfill his promise to marry her.

Andrea is unsure whether José Manuel loves her for who she is or for the heart that once belonged to Ángeles. Despite this and many other obstacles, they decide to get married. At the wedding ceremony, Ricarda (Blanca Guerra), José Manuel’s mother, full of hatred for Andrea, pulls out a gun, intending to kill her right at the altar.

She takes aim and shoots, but the bullet meant for Andrea hits José Manuel instead. He dies at the altar, in Andrea’s arms. A grieving Andrea, wanting to start anew, moves to Guadalajara joined by her loyal and trusted friend Vida (Niurka Marcos). Unbeknownst to Andrea, Raquela is also living there with an aunt.

One day, Andrea has a mishap on the street, and that is when she meets Jorge Robleto (also played by Eduardo Santamarina). She is shocked by his uncanny resemblance to José Manuel.  Although Andrea no longer believes in love, she begins to fall for Jorge.

She is unaware that Raquela has met him already and plans to win his love at all costs.  This will now bring even more suffering to Andrea.  Still, fate will intervene to ensure that the veil is worn by its deserving owner.

Cast
1st part
 
Susana González as Andrea Paz González
Eduardo Santamarina as José Manuel del Álamo Sánchez
Cynthia Klitbo as Raquela Villaseñor del Moral
Héctor Suárez as Azael Villaseñor: Raquela, Ángeles and Juan Carlos's father
Marlene Favela as Ángeles Villaseñor del Moral: Raquela and Juan Carlos's sister
Blanca Guerra as Ricarda Sánchez de del Álamo: José Manuel's mother
Julissa as Lía del Moral de Villaseñor: Raquela, Ángeles and Juan Carlos's mother
Paquita la del Barrio as Antonia González "Mamá Grande": Andrea and Anny's grandmother
Raymundo Capetillo as Filemón Paz: Andrea and Anny's father
Carmen Salinas as Malvina González: Andrea and Anny's mother
Jorge Poza as Rafael Sosa/Ernesto Sosa: Twin brothers
Roberto Vander as Germán del Alamo: José Manuel, Federica and Sebastián's father
Toño Mauri as Juan Carlos Villaseñor del Moral: Raquela and Ángeles's brother
Alan as Isaac Carvajal
Yuliana Peniche as Aniceta "Anny" Paz González: Andrea's sister, in love with Rafael
Jessica Segura as Nydia
Elizabeth Álvarez as Dulce María Salazar: Mistress of Azael
Niurka Marcos as Vida: Andrea's friend
Arturo Vázquez as Sebastián Paz/Sebastián del Álamo: Andrea and Anny's stepbrother, Federica and José Manuel's biological brother
Juan Imperio as Dr. Angelo
Alicia Fahr as Eduarda
Moisés Suárez as Demetrio Carillo
Joemy Blanco as Claudia Montenegro
Lorena de la Garza as Cachita Chávez
Mariana Sánchez as Federica del Álamo Sánchez: José Manuel's sister
Juan Carlos Franzoni as Erick
Vannya Valencia as Romina: Vida's sister
Martha Ortiz as Doña Catalina Sosa
Manolo Royo as Armando
Jaime Fernández as Hernán Ocampo
Manoella Torres as La Pecosa
Fernando Robles as Marcelo Mejía
Rubén Olivares as El Púas
Sandra Montoya as Yolanda Montero
Lucero Campos as Carmelita
Lucía Bravo as La Leona
Azalia as Lizárraga Ulloa
Nora Patricia Romero as Ana Luisa Reyes
Eric Aurioles "El Tlacua-H" as Pancho
Emilio Fernández as Memo
Yirelka Yeraldine as Alambrito Almanedá
Uberto Bondoni as Aarón Montenegro
Cynthia Urias as Jovita Luna
Adriana Chapela as Olga
Ricardo Margaleff as Adán
Sergio Argueta as Teo
Angel Enciso as Zury
Elena Silva as Imelda
Enrique Bermúdez as Mauro
Juan Carilles as Javier Ortiz Insunza
Juan M. Espadas as Isauro
Silvio Gomagui as Nicolás Nava
Arturo Guizar as Lic. Yépez
Pablo Cheng as Tequila
Irma Dorantes as Isabel "Chabelita"
Pablo Magallanes as Raúl
Miguel Ángel Loyo as Leonel Carvajal
Pietro Vannucci as Luigi
Manuel Landeta as Román Ruiz
Raúl Padilla "Chóforo" as Jacinto
Raúl Magaña as Lic. Efraín Vega
Carlos Bonavides as himself
Juan Verduzco
Adriana Rojo
Natalia Traven
Libertad
Carlos Probert

2nd part
 
Susana González as Andrea Paz González
Eduardo Santamarina as Jorge Robleto: José Manuel's lookalike
Cynthia Klitbo as Raquela Villaseñor del Moral: in love with José Manuel
Carmen Salinas as Malvina González: Andrea and Anny's mother
Niurka Marcos as Vida: Andrea's friend
Lilia Aragón as Enriqueta Valverde del Moral: Arturo's mother
Humberto Elizondo as Pedro Robleto: Jorge and Alexis's father
Imanol Landeta as Alexis Robleto: Jorge's brother
Irma Dorantes as Isabel "Chabelita"
Silvia Mariscal as Leticia de Robleto: Jorge and Alexis's mother
Mónica Dossetti as Francisca "Paca" Rivero
Claudia Silva as Virginia Mirabal de del Moral
Miguel Pizarro as Reynaldo Portillo
Aitor Iturrioz as Marcos Ruiz
Bobby Larios as Beto Castell: Vida's husband
Lorena Velázquez as Adela Mirabal: Arturo's wife, Virginia's aunt
Isabel Martínez "La Tarabilla" as Zoila Ramírez/Belén
José Luis Cordero as Gumaro Estrada
Óscar Traven as Lic. Álvaro Julio Castillo
Amparo Garrido as Cándida
Julio Preciado as Father Julio Monterde
Luis Madaría as Arturo del Moral Valverde: Raquela's cousin
Lorena Enríquez as Inés González
Jessica Segura as Nydia
Emilio Fernández as Guillermo "Memo"
Roberto Marín as Hugo
María Clara Zurita as Úrsula
Teo Tapia as Lucio González
Claudia Ortega as Sandra
Vanessa Arias as Neddy
Latin Lover as Latin
Gabriel de Cervantes as Dr. Quintanilla
Estrella Lugo as Gloria
Eduardo Antonio as Dr. Eduardo Bárcenas
Archie Lafranco as Carlos Alfredo Escobar
Flor Procuna as Josefa "Fefa"
Kelchie Arizmendi as Patricia
Ángeles Alonso as Teresa
Rebeca Manríquez as Lamara
Andrés Puentes Jr. as Sammy
Rebeca Mankita as Yara
Dalilah Polanco as Aracely
Hugo Aceves as Chato
Juan Carlos Bonet as Arsenio López
Raúl Castellanos as Enrique
Queta Lavat as Socorro
Hugo Macías Macotela as Don Filiberto Castell
Rubén Morales as Basilio López
Francisco Avendaño as Lic. Galvis
Naydelin Navarrete as Patricia
Fátima Torre as Flavia Morales
Lucía Pailles 
Elena Silva as Imelda Pérez
Ramón Menéndez as Jiménez
Erendira Zumaya as Lalita
Arturo Guizar as Host
Roberto Ruy as Evaristo
Miriam Jasso as Alicia
Shula as Marissa
Albert Chavez as Contreras
Pablo Cheng as Tequila
Ileana Muñiz as Susy
Sergio Jiménez as Juez Estévez
Juan Carlos Novoa as Bigotes
Mauricio Roldan as Braulio Cancino
Carlos Balart as Tony
Tomas García as Jaro
Carlos Bonavides as himself
José Miguel Checa as Dr. Molina

Soundtrack

Awards and nominations

References

External links

 at esmas.com 

2003 telenovelas
Mexican telenovelas
2003 Mexican television series debuts
2004 Mexican television series endings
Television shows set in Veracruz
Televisa telenovelas
Mexican television series based on Brazilian television series
Spanish-language telenovelas